Ioannis G. Pallikaris (born November 18, 1947) is a Greek ophthalmologist who in 1989 performed the first LASIK procedure on a human eye. Pallikaris also developed Epi-LASIK.

Professor Palikaris was the rector of the University of Crete between 2003 and 2011. He is also the founder and director of the Institute of Vision and Optics  in the same university.

Professor Pallikaris serves as the Medical Advisory Board Chair for Presbia, an ophthalmic device company, where he is responsible for overseeing the post-market surveillance trials of the Flexivue Microlens, a corneal inlay treatment for presbyopia, the age-related loss of near vision. He also conducts training sessions for surgeons at the Vardinoyannion Eye Institute. The Flexivue Microlens is a 3-mm in diameter lens that is inserted into a corneal pocket created by a femtosecond laser in the non-dominant eye of a presbyopic patient. The lens preserves the patient's distance vision, while providing equivalent near vision correction, allowing the patient to focus on near objects without the aid of reading glasses.

References

Greek ophthalmologists
Living people
20th-century Greek physicians
21st-century Greek physicians
Academic staff of the University of Crete
Year of birth missing (living people)
Heads of universities and colleges in Greece